The God's Not Dead film series consists of American Christian-fiction drama films, based on the book of same name authored by Rice Broocks. The overall plot centers on a Christian pastor named Rev. David "Dave" Hill, who argues for the reality of God through a number of occurrences, in a modern-day society. The main characters of the series are often forced to present proof of their beliefs.

The films have been met overall with negative critical reception, but were popular with Christian audiences, and were successful at the box office.

Origin 

The 2015 Evangelical Christian book by Rice Broocks titled God's Not Dead: Evidence for God in an Age of Uncertainty, serves as the inspiration for the God's Not Dead films. Released by Thomas Nelson Publishing, the book is presented by the author in a self-help manner, and argues for belief in Jesus and the Holy Bible. The book encourages Christians to remain firm in their beliefs, and to evangelize to others in society. The religious textbook features in the plot of the film series.

Films

God's Not Dead (2014) 

A college student named Josh Wheaton who seeks to attain higher learning in pursuing further education, finds that his Christian faith brings him to a confrontation with his philosophy professor. The teacher named Professor Radisson, begins the class by having each student sign a document that denies the existence of God. When Josh refuses to denounce his beliefs, the professor decides that a debate between the two of them will determine his final grade. Should the entire class be convinced by Josh's statements, he can pass the course. If the class is not moved, his academic future may be at an end.

As Josh tries to prepare for this classroom event, various other individuals struggle with their personal stumbling blocks that seem to pull them away from their faith in Jesus Christ. With the assistance of the leader of his church, Reverend David "Dave" Hill, Josh prepares for the assignment. Along the way he believes there is a higher purpose to the conversation with his college professor, than merely to pass the class.

God's Not Dead 2: He's Surely Alive (2016) 

A young high schooler named Brooke Thawley is coming to terms with the passing of her brother. Though her parents have raised the family in an atheist setting, she continues to have questions about the existence of an afterlife. She becomes impressed by the positive disposition of her history teacher named Grace Wesley, who always has joy regardless of the day. In a one-on-one conversation after class with her teacher, Ms. Wesley shares with her that a belief in a Savior, gives her purpose.

When the Salvation Army comes to the house after her parents decide to donate his belongings, Brooke is surprised to discover that he had been studying The Holy Bible. As she longs for her brother's presence, she too begins to read from its pages. One day in her history class, the lesson centers around the teachings of Mahatma Gandhi and Reverend Martin Luther King Jr. and their respective sacrifices for their beliefs. Brooke raises her hand and asks about the parallels between these historical figures, and the teachings of Jesus Christ. As Grace knows what Brooke has been going through in her personal life, she acknowledges the similarities and quotes some lines of scripture to emphasize the girl's realizations. Another student in the class records the interaction using their cell phone, and tells someone else that the teacher has been preaching in the classroom. By word of mouth, the incident gets relayed to the principal of the school. Grace is called into the office and given disciplinary action, and is placed on administrative leave, while the school investigates the situation. At her next meeting, she is given a plea deal by the School Board, where she will retain her job by apologizing for sharing these scriptures in class. Grace sees this as denouncing her beliefs, and argues that she did nothing wrong by acknowledging her student's question. The Board options to send the occurrence to court, where she will have to legally fight to retain her job.

As Grace prepares for the trial by hiring a lawyer through a teachers union, the prosecutor tries to subpoena the sermons of all local preachers. Additionally, the prosecuting team approaches Brooke's parents with the option that if they stand as a witness against her teacher, appearing as examples that "there is no all-knowing deity", they will ensure the girl gets funding for her college education. When the trial begins, Grace defends her freedom of speech, and the defensive attorneys argue that the discussion that took place in class was an example of a historical analysis of Jesus, as opposed to purely evangelical. Reverend David Hill is approached with a request to release his sermons to the prosecuting team, to which he denies their request, resulting in his eventual arrest by state authorities.

When Brooke decides to take a stand as a witness in favor of the intentions of her teacher, the young high schooler finds her new-found faith means something more as she must defend her beliefs in a court of law.

God's Not Dead: A Light in Darkness (2018) 

After some time, Reverend David Hill is released from incarceration following his denial to legal authorities in releasing his evangelical materials. Controversy surrounding his arrest ignites discussions on at the campus, to close the St. James Church and convert the building to a secular school extension. As the school board votes in favor to shut down the church, Rev. Dave and Rev. Jude Mbaye attempt to convince them otherwise. When this proves to be unfruitful, they option to sue the college. A student named Adam who is angered by his recent breakup with his girlfriend throws a brick into the church window, unintentionally starting a fire which almost destroys the build and kills Jude who was inside at the time.

David seeks the help of his estranged brother Pearce, a successful atheist lawyer. His brother does not believe that the case is something worth fighting for, and tries to convince Rev. Dave of the unprobeable outcome. Overcome with guilt, Adam confesses to the fire through a text message. The young man is arrested, and scheduled to be tried for felony charges. As David seeks divine guidance, he must decide whether to let the charges go or if the mistakes of the college student should end in his imprisonment; all while receiving spiritual promptings that St. James Church may not be the answer to his ecclesiastical responsibilities.

God's Not Dead: We the People (2021) 

A group of families choose to begin home-schooling their children, following a sermon by their local pastor. After an unexpected visit from a social services worker, the parents find themselves at odds with the law, when the representative decides that what is being taught in the home is not sufficient. Citing state core standards, a local judge gives the group a week to develop a court case that they will present before a court of low in Washington D.C. where they must show that their at home studies are adequate to meet the requirements; otherwise the children will need to return to public schooling. As the parents develop their case, various other leaders of churches become involved including Reverend David Hill.

Taken aback by what he believes to be government interference over their personal freedoms, Rev. Hill finds that he is determined to help these families prove that they are free to teach their children as they would like, and to enlighten Congress that in a modern-day United States, God is still present and relevant.

God's Not Dead: Rise Up (2023) 

In September 2022, it was announced that a fifth installment in the film series was in development and officially titled, God's Not Dead: Rise Up. Directed by Harold Cronk, the premise will follow Reverend David "Dave" Hill as he runs for office in a campaign against an opponent that seeks to remove religion from public policy; and the Reverend begins to question: "Is God dead in American politics?"

David A.R. White will reprise his staring role in addition to serving as producer, while Dean Cain, Isaiah Washington, Ray Wise, Cory Oliver and Brad Heller will return in their respective roles. Production is scheduled to commence in the last months during 2022, in South Carolina. The project will be a joint-venture production between Pure Flix Studios, and Pinnacle Peak Pictures. The film is scheduled to release in 2023.

Main cast and characters

Additional crew and production details

Reception

Box office and financial performance

Critical and public response

References 

 
Films about evangelicalism
American film series
Films about Christianity
Criticism of atheism
Religious controversies in film
Film series introduced in 2014
Drama film series